Matthew Pearce (22 April 1967 – 23 January 2016) was a Canadian football player who played for the Winnipeg Blue Bombers and Montreal Concordes. Prior to his career in the Canadian Football League, he played at the University of British Columbia. After his career, he was a teacher in his hometown of Prince George, British Columbia, also serving with the Prince George District Teachers' Association at one point. He died of an apparent heart attack in 2016.

References

1967 births
2016 deaths
Sportspeople from Prince George, British Columbia
Players of Canadian football from British Columbia
UBC Thunderbirds football players
Winnipeg Blue Bombers players